Deroplatys angustata is a species of praying mantis in the family Deroplatyinae.

This "dead leaf mantis" species is native to Southeast Asia.

See also
 
 List of mantis genera and species

References

angustata
Mantodea of Southeast Asia
Insects described in 1845
Taxa named by John O. Westwood